Mercedes Pacheco del Barrio (born 29 May 1978) is a Spanish former artistic gymnast. She competed at the 1996 Summer Olympics.

References

1978 births
Living people
Spanish female artistic gymnasts
Gymnasts at the 1996 Summer Olympics
Olympic gymnasts of Spain
Place of birth missing (living people)
20th-century Spanish women